The 2004-05 Cupa României was the 2nd annual Romanian women's football knockout tournaments.

Quarterfinals

Semifinals

Final

References

Rom
Fem
Rom
Women's sport in Romania